Cabaiguán is a municipality and town in the province of Sancti Spíritus, Cuba. With an urban population of 30,135 is the 3rd largest town of the province.

Overview
It was founded in 1894, and established as a municipality in 1926. The municipality is divided into the consejos populares (i.e. "popular councils") of Cabaiguán and the villages of Neiva, Pedro Barba, Guayos and Santa Lucía.

Demographics
In 2004, the municipality of Cabaiguán had a population of 67,224. Cabaiguan was known as the Cuban epicenter of migration from the Canary Islands.

Economy
Cabaiguán is best known for its cigars; and there is a small cigar factory where various brands of international renown are produced. It also has an oil refinery built in 1947 and the Nieves Morejon quarry, where the Provincial Prison is located.

Transport
The town straddles the Carretera Central highway and is served by the A1 motorway. It has a railway station on the central Havana-Santiago line.

See also

Municipalities of Cuba
List of cities in Cuba

References

External links

 Cabaiguán at Encyclopædia Britannica
  Cabaiguán on EcuRed

Cities in Cuba
Populated places in Sancti Spíritus Province
Populated places established in 1894